1937 Emperor's Cup Final was the 17th final of the Emperor's Cup competition. The final was played at Meiji Jingu Gaien Stadium in Tokyo on June 13, 1937. Keio University won the championship.

Overview
Keio University won the championship, by defeating Kobe University of Commerce 3–0, include Hirokazu Ninomiya 2 goals.

Match details

See also
1937 Emperor's Cup

References

Emperor's Cup
1937 in Japanese football